Raney is a surname, and may refer to:
Albert Raney, Sr. (contemporary), developer of Mystic Caverns in Arkansas, USA
Catherine Raney (born 1980), American Olympic speed skater
Chad Raney (born 1970), American entrepreneur; founder of Lone Star Music
Della H. Raney (1912-1987), African American Army nurse.
Doug Raney (born 1956), American jazz guitarist; son of Jimmy Raney
George P. Raney (1845–1911), American politician and jurist; justice of the Florida Supreme Court 1885–1894
Jimmy Raney (1927–1995), American jazz guitarist
John Henry Raney (1849–1928), American politician from Missouri; U.S. representative 1895–97
John N. Raney (born 1947), American politician and businessman
Murray Raney (1885–1966), American mechanical engineer; inventor of Raney nickel
Paul Hartley Raney (1892–1917), Canadian fighter pilot killed in World War I
Sue Raney (born 1940), American jazz singer
Tom Raney, comic-book artist.
Wayne Raney (1921–1993), American country singer
William Raney (1859–1933), Canadian lawyer, politician, and judge from Ontario

See also
 Raney nickel
 Rainey
 Ranney (disambiguation)